Ravindu Kodituwakku (born 13 October 1997) is a Sri Lankan cricketer. He made his first-class debut for Tamil Union Cricket and Athletic Club in the 2017–18 Premier League Tournament on 15 December 2017. Prior to his first-class debut, he scored 119 runs from 129 balls in an under-19 match for S. Thomas' College, Mount Lavinia in February 2017.

He made his Twenty20 debut for Tamil Union Cricket and Athletic Club in the 2017–18 SLC Twenty20 Tournament on 1 March 2018. He made his List A debut for Tamil Union Cricket and Athletic Club in the 2017–18 Premier Limited Overs Tournament on 12 March 2018.

References

External links
 

1997 births
Living people
Sri Lankan cricketers
Kalutara Town Club cricketers
Tamil Union Cricket and Athletic Club cricketers
Place of birth missing (living people)